Frédéric Forestier (born 1969) is a French director.

Filmography

Director 
 1993 Paranoïa (short film)
 1997 The Peacekeeper
 2002 Le Boulet - More than 3 million ticket sales in France.
 2005 Les Parrains - More than 600,000 ticket sales in France.
 2008 Astérix aux Jeux Olympiques - More than 6 million ticket sales in France.
 2012  Stars 80

Actor 
 2009 Kaamelott, Livre VI (Aulus Milonius Procyon)

See also 
 
 

1969 births
Living people
French male screenwriters
French screenwriters
French male television actors
French male film actors
Film directors from Paris